Uranium disilicide is an inorganic chemical compound of uranium in oxidation state +4. It is a silicide of uranium.
There has been recent interest in using uranium disilicide as an alternative to uranium dioxide for
fuel in nuclear reactors. Advantages are higher
percentage of uranium and higher thermal conductivity. A direct replacement of UO2 with U3Si2
should enable a reactor to generate more energy from a set of fuel rods and also provide more "coping time" in the case of a LOCA (Loss of Cooling Accident).

The development of uranium disilicide, uranium nitride, or other high thermal conductivity uranium compound may be critical for the performance of "Accident Tolerant Fuel", a
development effort mandated by the US Department of Energy. This is due to zircalloy having a higher thermal
conductivity than all replacement materials being developed. In particular, SIC-SiC CMC (link), which has several superior material properties to zircalloy for this application, has about five times lower thermal conductivity (varies due to the manufacturing methods used for the fiber and for the matrix) than zircalloy.(refs on SiC-SiC and zircalloy). The lower thermal conductivity means that a reactor using fuel rods with SiC-SiC CMC cladding and conventional UO2 fuel will have to either: 1) Run at a lower power output to keep the fuel the same temperature, or 2) Run with the same power, with the fuel hotter, which means the reactor has less coping time (time to fix what is wrong before something fails). The alternative, enabled by U3Si2 which has about five times better thermal conductivity than UO2 , is expected to be a fuel rod capable of equal power output, slightly better energy output, and longer coping time.

References

Further reading

http://www.rertr.anl.gov/Web1999/Abstracts/18suripto99.html

Uranium compounds
Transition metal silicides